Pterosauromorpha (meaning "pterosaur-like forms") is one of the two basic divisions of Ornithodira that includes pterosaurs and all taxa that are closer to them than to dinosaurs and their close relatives (i.e. Dinosauromorpha). In addition to pterosaurs, Pterosauromorpha also includes the basal clade Lagerpetidae and some other  Late Triassic ornithodirans (Maehary and Scleromochlus).

Classification 

The name Pterosauromorpha was originally coined by Emil Kuhn-Schnyder and Hans Rieber (1986) for a reptilian subclass distinct from Archosauria which includes pterosaurs. In 1997, Kevin Padian classified Pterosauromorpha as a clade of archosaurs and proposed phylogenetic definition for this group: "Pterosauria and all ornithodiran archosaurs closer to them than to dinosaurs". Brian Andres and Kevin Padian redefined Pterosauromorpha as: "The clade consisting of Pterodactylus (originally Ornithocephalus) antiquus (Sömmerring 1812) (Pterosauria) and all organisms or species that share a more recent common ancestor with it than with Alligator (originally Crocodilus) mississippiensis (Daudin 1802) (Suchia) and Compsognathus longipes Wagner 1859 (Dinosauromorpha)".

Lagerpetidae was traditionally considered the earliest diverging group of dinosauromorphs. This caused no other reptiles besides the true pterosaurs to be placed in Pterosauromorpha. The only notable exception was a small reptile named Scleromochlus, whose placement within the clade itself remained controversial due the poor preservation of its otherwise complete remains. Different phylogenetic analyses found it as a basal pterosauromorph, a non-aphanosaurian, non-pterosaur basal avemetatarsalian, a basal dinosauromorph, or a basal archosauriform. This has resulted in a large gap between the fully aerial pterosaurs and their terrestrial ancestors, as the earliest pterosaurs were already capable flyers.

First iteration of phylogenetic analysis produced by Kammerer et al. (2020) restored lagerpetids as a basal dinosauromorphs, which corresponds to the traditional point of view. But the second iteration, in which were added Scleromochlus, found Lagerpetidae as the most basal pterosauromorphs, and Scleromochlus as the sister taxon of pterosaurs. In a study that used micro-CT scans, Ezcurra et al. (2020) have found additional similarities, including large semicircular canals within the bones of some lagerpetids that resemble that of pterosaurs. It is assumed that large semicircular canals are related to arboreal, aerial or other agile forms of terrestrial locomotion as well as rapid movements. The flocculus, the part of the brain that aids in transmitting information, was also large in both pterosaurs and lagerpetids, though to a lesser extent. When Ezcurra et al. (2020) included Scleromochlus in their analysis, they found it to be the most basal pterosauromorph, sister to a clade including lagerpetids and pterosaurs. Baron (2021) conducted his own analysis, which confirmed the relationship between lagerpetids and pterosaurs.

Kellner et al. (2022) described Maehary, a small ornithodiran from the Late Triassic of Brazil. It was interpreted as a basal pterosauromorph (along with lagerpetids). It is noteworthy that left maxilla of Maehary was previously considered to be a specimen of Faxinalipterus that was re-classified as a lagerpetid.

Nesbitt et al. (2011)

Ezcurra et al. (2020)

Kellner et al. (2022)

References 

 
Prehistoric avemetatarsalians
Carnian first appearances
Maastrichtian extinctions